Zackary Leon Furst is an Australian chef based in Melbourne, Australia.

Education 
Furst was born and raised in Wodonga, Victoria, Australia. Furst studied at William Angliss Institute of TAFE. Furst attended Catholic College Wodonga. Furst also went to St. Augustine’s Primary School.

Career 
In 2016, he is the sous chef at IDES. In 2019, Furst appointed as the head chef at Bar Liberty in Melbourne.

He spent two years at Ben Shewry's acclaimed Ripponlea restaurant, Attica. He worked at Beechworth’s Provenance Restaurant before moving to Melbourne and training in French cuisine under chef Gabriel Martin.

Awards 

 The Good Food Guide Young Chef of the Year Award 2022
 Time Out magazine’s Hot Talent Award in 2018
 Electrolux Young Chef of the Year Awards – Finalist
 San Pellegrino Best Young Chef 2017 – Finalist
 National Golden Chef’s Hat Award 2014 (National) – Victorian title

Personal life 
Furst was exposed to the food industry because his parents, Ted and Jacinta, were managing a catering company. As early as 10 years old, Zackary helped in the family business together with his four siblings.

References 

Living people

Year of birth missing (living people)
Australian chefs